Guangming station, is a station of Line 6 and Line 6 Branch of the Shenzhen Metro. Line 6 platforms opened on 18 August 2020 and Line 6 Branch platforms opened on 28 November 2022.

Station layout

Exits

References

Shenzhen Metro stations
Railway stations in Guangdong
Railway stations in China opened in 2020